Jack Bancroft (9 October 1879 – 7 January 1942), born John Bancroft, was a Welsh cricketer, and rugby union international. He was a right-handed batsman and a wicket-keeper who played for Glamorgan. Bancroft also played rugby for Swansea RFC. He was born and died in Swansea.

Bancroft's brother, Billy, was a Welsh rugby international and the first paid professional for the Glamorgan cricketing side. His father William was groundsman at St. Helen's rugby and cricket ground, and Jack showed great interest and skill in both cricket and rugby from an early age.

Rugby career
As well as playing for Swansea at club level, Bancroft was capped eighteen times for the Welsh national team. He gained his first international cap in 1909 replacing the injured Bert Winfield. against England. During Bancroft's career he scored 19 points against France in the 1910 international, at the time a record for a Welsh player in a single match. His final game for Wales was against France in 1914.

International matches
Wales
 1909, 1910, 1911, 1912, 1914
 1909, 1910, 1911, 1914
 1909, 1910, 1911, 1912, 1913
 1909, 1910, 1912, 1914

Cricket career
Jack Bancroft was wicket-keeper for Swansea, and played Minor Counties Cricket for Glamorgan as early as 1908. Bancroft was called up to the Glamorgan first team on nine occasions during the 1922 season before hanging up his gloves.

Bancroft was a tailend batsman alongside teammate Jack Nash.

Bibliography

References

External links
Jack Bancroft at Cricket Archive

1879 births
1942 deaths
Cricketers from Swansea
Glamorgan cricketers
Rugby union players from Swansea
Rugby union fullbacks
Swansea RFC players
Wales rugby union captains
Wales international rugby union players
Welsh cricketers
Welsh rugby union players
Wicket-keepers